is a Japanese former singer. Her career began in 2002 when she passed the audition for Hello! Project Kids, an all-female teen pop group within Hello! Project. She continued to sing in that group and became a part of two smaller groups composed of Hello! Project Kids members, Berryz Kobo and ZYX. She is captain of J-pop band Berryz Kobo.

Early life 
Shimizu was born in Tokyo, Japan. In 2002, she passed the Hello! Project Kids Audition.

Career 
As a member of Berryz Kobo, she participated in their radio show Berryz Kobo Kiritsu! Rei! Chakuseki!.

She was cast as one of the main characters in "Koinu Dan no Monogatari". Many members of Hello! Project Kids and Morning Musume participated in this film.

In 2003, Shimizu was chosen to join the group ZYX, which consisted of five Hello! Project Kids and Mari Yaguchi, who acted as a mentor. They released two singles: "Iku ZYX! Fly High" and "Shiroi Tokyo". They remained active until 2004, when Saki and Momoko Tsugunaga became members of Berryz Kobo.

In 2004, Hello! Project participated in a large shuffle group that produced the single, "All For One & One For All!" This song is considered one of the themes of Hello! Project.

On December 31, 2006, Shimizu took the stage at the 57th edition of Kōhaku Uta Gassen as a backup dancer in Morning Musume's performance of Aruiteru, along with the remaining members of Berryz Kobo, Country Musume and Cute.

In 2008, Shimizu became a member of Hello! Project's new unit High-King. This shuffle unit came out with the single, to promote Morning Musume's Cinderella Musical.

In March 2021, she announced that she had married, and that she would retire in November.

She retired from the entertainment world on November 23, 2021.

Hello! Project groups and units
 Hello! Project Kids
 ZYX (2003–?)
 Berryz Kobo (2004–2015)
 H.P. All Stars (2004)
 High-King (2008–2015)
 Hello! Project Mobekimasu (2011)
 Green Fields (2012–2015)

Discography

Appearances

Movies 
 Koinu Dan no Monogatari (2002)
 Promise Land ~Clovers no Daibōken~ (2004)

Radio 
 Berryz Kobo Kiritsu! Rei! Chakuseki! lit. "Berryz Workshop, Rise! Bow! Be seated!" (March 30, 2005 – March 31, 2009)
 Berryz Kobo Beritsuu! (April 10, 2009 – current) (Co-host: Tokunaga Chinami and Sudo Maasa)

Internet 
 8th Hello Pro Video Chat (Hello! Project on Flets) (May 2, 2005)

References

External links 
 Berryz Kobo: Official Hello! Project profile 
 Shimizu Saki: Official Blog 
  

1991 births
Living people
Singers from Tokyo
Berryz Kobo members
Japanese women pop singers
ZYX (pop group) members
Hello! Project Kids members
Japanese idols
Japanese voice actresses
Japanese child singers
Musicians from Kanagawa Prefecture
21st-century Japanese singers
21st-century Japanese actresses
21st-century Japanese women singers